There are at least 22 named lakes and reservoirs in Fulton County, Arkansas.

Lakes
The only named natural lake in Fulton County is the Mill Pond (also known as Spring Lake). The lake is the central landmark of the Mammoth Spring State Park

Reservoirs

	Bulls Eye Lake, el. 
	Camp Kia Kima Lake, el. 
	Courtwright Lake, el. 
	Dogget Lake, el. 
	East Arkansas Council Boy Scouts Lake, el. 
	Fountain Lake, el. 
	Heldebrend Lake, el. 
	James Lake, el. 
	Lake Aztec, el. 
	Lake Bertie, el. 
	Lake Brown, el. 
	Lake Chanute, el. 
	Lake Leon, el. 
	Lake Lewis One, el. 
	Lake Omaha, el. 
	Langston Lake, el. 
	McCullough Lake, el. 
	Norfork Lake, el. 
	North Lake, el. 
	Sparks Lake, el. 
	Spring Lake, el. 
	Timber Lake, el. 
	Winlake Reservoir, el.

See also

 List of lakes in Arkansas

Notes

Bodies of water of Fulton County, Arkansas
Fulton